Oleh Hornykiewicz (17 November 1926 – 26 May 2020) was an Austrian biochemist.

Life
Oleh Hornykiewicz was born in 1926 in Sykhiw (a district of Lviv), then in Poland (now Ukraine). In 1951, he received his M.D. degree from the University of Vienna and joined the faculty of his alma mater the same year and worked there ever since. He also served for twenty years as chairman of the Institute of Biochemical Pharmacology. In 1967, he began a long association with the University of Toronto in Canada and, in 1992, he was named professor emeritus at that institution.

One of his seminal accomplishments was the discovery that Parkinson's disease was due to dopamine deficiency in the brain. He also played a key role in the development of L-dopa as a therapy for the disorder.

Awards
1972 Gairdner Foundation International Award
1979 Wolf Prize in Medicine, jointly with Roger Wolcott Sperry and Arvid Carlsson, "for opening a new approach in the control of Parkinson's disease by L-Dopa."
1993 Ludwig Wittgenstein Prize of the Austrian Science Foundation
1994 Schmiedeberg Medal of the German Society for Experimental and Clinical Pharmacology and Toxicology
2001 Bill Roth Medal
2008 Austrian Cross of Honour for Science and Art, 1st class
2010 Austrian Decoration for Science and Art
 2014 Warren Alpert Foundation Prize

References

1926 births
2020 deaths
Scientists from Lviv
Austrian biochemists
University of Vienna alumni
Academic staff of the University of Vienna
Wolf Prize in Medicine laureates
Recipients of the Austrian Decoration for Science and Art
Austrian people of Ukrainian descent